Dom George Frederick James Temple FRS OSB (born 2 September 1901, London; died 30 January 1992, Isle of Wight) was an English mathematician, recipient of the Sylvester Medal in 1969. He was President of the London Mathematical Society in the years 1951–1953.

Temple took his first degree as an evening student at Birkbeck College, London, between 1918 and 1922, and also worked there as a research assistant. In 1924 he moved to Imperial College as a demonstrator, where he worked under the direction of Sydney Chapman. After a period spent with Eddington at Cambridge, he returned to Imperial as reader in mathematics. He was appointed professor of mathematics at King's College London in 1932, where he returned after war service with the Royal Aircraft Establishment at Farnborough. In 1953 he was appointed Sedleian Professor of Natural Philosophy at the University of Oxford, a chair which he held until 1968, and in which he succeeded Chapman. He was also an honorary Fellow of Queen's College, Oxford.

After the death of his wife in 1980, Temple, a devout Christian, took monastic vows in the Benedictine order and entered Quarr Abbey on the Isle of Wight, where he remained until his death.

Bibliography
 George Temple (1981) 100 Years of Mathematics: a personal viewpoint, Springer-Verlag .

References

External links

20th-century English mathematicians
English Benedictines
1901 births
1992 deaths
Alumni of Birkbeck, University of London
Fellows of The Queen's College, Oxford
Academics of King's College London
Academics of Imperial College London
Fellows of the Royal Society
People educated at Ealing County Grammar School for Boys
Sedleian Professors of Natural Philosophy